How Does Your Garden Grow? is an album by the American alternative rock trio Better Than Ezra, released in 1998 via Elektra Records. It was the band's second album with drummer Travis Aaron McNabb.

The album peaked at No. 128 on the Billboard charts. The first single, "One More Murder", peaked at No. 32 on the Billboard Modern Rock charts, while the second single, "At the Stars", peaked at No. 17.

Following the release of How Does Your Garden Grow?, Elektra dropped the band.

In 2013, the album was re-released on DVD-Audio in 5.1 surround sound.

Production
The album was produced by Malcolm Burn. It was recorded at the band's Fudge Studios, in New Orleans. The album cover is subtitled "A Series of Nocturnes".

Critical reception
The Washington Post called the album "clever, consistent and deftly eclectic."

AllMusic wrote that "the new ambition in the music (even if it isn't adventurous) and the catchier, more emotional songwriting is enough to elevate How Does Your Garden Grow? to the status of Better Than Ezra's best album."

Track listing
All tracks by Kevin Griffin
 "Je ne m'en Souviens pas" – 4:43
 "One More Murder" – 4:39
 "At the Stars" – 3:43
 "Like It Like That" – 2:44
 "Allison Foley" – 3:45
 "Under You" – 4:56
 "Live Again" – 4:24
 "Happy Day Mama" – 3:22
 "Pull" – 2:58
 "Particle" – 6:04
 "Beautiful Mistake" – 4:35
 "Everything in 2's" – 3:47
 "New Kind of Low: Low / Coma" – 5:17
 "Waxing or Waning?" – 3:21

Personnel
 Kevin Griffin – Guitar, Vocals, Rhodes, Piano, Chamberlin, VCS3
 Tom Drummond – Bass, Pedal Steel, MetaSynth, VCS3
 Travis Aaron McNabb – Drums, Percussion, Beat Box, VCS3, Optigan

Additional personnel
 Anthony Dagradi – Flute
 Mark Mullins – Trombone
 Brian Graber – Trumpet
 James Arthur Payne – Guitar, Vocals
 Karl Berger – Vibraphone

References

1998 albums
Better Than Ezra albums
Albums produced by Malcolm Burn
Elektra Records albums